Kyai Haji Abdullah Wasi'an (9 June 1917 – 16 February 2011) is an ustad, teacher and Christology expert from Indonesia.

Since 1936, when he was 19 years old, Wasi'an has been active in organizations. He started through the Muhammadiyah Youth (Pemuda Muhammadiyah) in Surabaya. As a member of the education team, he was in charge of Taman Pustaka Pemuda Muhammadiyah, a library with a complete collection of books at that time. This position pleased him very much because as a science lover he could read as much as he wanted.

His involvement in the Muhammadiyah Youth was the beginning of him being involved in the field of da'wah. He gained experience in organizing, lecturing and debating. In a short time he was appointed as the preacher of the Muhammadiyah Youth. His job is to lecture at Muhammadiyah-owned schools and several state schools. Then, in the 1950s, Abdullah Wasi'an was appointed a member of the Muhammadiyah Surabaya Board, in the Tabligh Council.

Abdullah Wasi'an accidentally became a Christologist. At that time, Christology education was still scarce. He did not get Christology from formal education, but he was self-taught. This is different from the current era, where Christology is a subject that can be obtained at the Ushuluddin Faculty at the Islamic University.

Furthermore, through diligent efforts, Abdullah Wasi'an's mastery of Christology was profound. He very much memorized the contents of the Bible and could even understand them well. He is also fluent in English, French, German and Dutch. Because of this, he succeeded in becoming a Christologist who was respected by pastors and other Christian figures. Armed with Christology, Wasi'an had a long experience of debating with many Christian priests or leaders.

Wasi'an died on February 16, 2011, and was buried in his hometown, Surabaya.

References

1917 births
2011 deaths
People from Surabaya
Indonesian Muslim missionaries
20th-century Muslim scholars of Islam
21st-century Muslim scholars of Islam
Sunni clerics